Interstate 140 may refer to:
Interstate 140 (North Carolina), a partially built spur route near Wilmington, North Carolina
Interstate 140 (North Carolina 1999), a cancelled proposed spur between Sanford and Raleigh, North Carolina
Interstate 140 (Tennessee), a spur route in Knoxville, Tennessee

40-1
1